The Djibouti Premier League is the highest division in association football in Djibouti. It was formed in 1987. ASAS Djibouti Télécom is the most successful club in the Djibouti Premier League, having won a total of 7 championships.

Clubs

2022–23 season clubs

Champions

Wins by year

 1987: AS Etablissements Merill
 1988: AS Compagnie Djibouti-Ethiopie
 1989: not played
 1990: not played
 1991: Aéroport
 1992: not played
 1993: not played
 1994: Force Nationale Securité
 1995: Force Nationale Securité
 1996: Force Nationale Securité
 1996–97: Forces Armées Djiboutiennes
 1997–98: AS Compagnie Djibouti-Ethiopie
 1998–99: Force Nationale de Police
 1999–2000: AS Boreh
 2000–01: Force Nationale de Police
 2001–02: AS Boreh
 2002–03: Gendarmerie Nationale
 2003–04: Gendarmerie Nationale
 2004–05: AS Compagnie Djibouti-Ethiopie
 2005–06: FC Société Immobiliére de Djibouti (S.I.D)
 2006–07: AS Compagnie Djibouti-Ethiopie
 2007–08: FC Société Immobiliére de Djibouti (S.I.D)
 2008–09: ASAS Djibouti Télécom
 2009–10: AS Port
 2010–11: AS Port
 2011–12: AS Port
 2012–13: ASAS Djibouti Télécom
 2013–14: ASAS Djibouti Télécom
 2014–15: ASAS Djibouti Télécom
 2015–16: ASAS Djibouti Télécom
 2016–17: ASAS Djibouti Télécom
 2017–18: ASAS Djibouti Télécom
 2018–19: AS Port
 2019–20: GR / SIAF
 2020–21: AS Arta/Solar7
 2021–22: AS Arta/Solar7

Wins by club

Top scorers

See also
 Football in Djibouti
 Djiboutian Football Federation
 Djibouti national football team
 Djibouti Cup
 Stade du Ville

References

External links
 Website of the Federation  – Standings & results
 RSSSF competition history

Djibouti Premier League
Football leagues in Djibouti
Djibouti
1987 establishments in Djibouti
Sports leagues established in 1987